Jurka Listapad (full name Ю́рый Іва́навіч Лістапа́д); 7 April 1897 - 5 July 1938) was an active participant in the Belarusian independence movement and anti-Soviet resistance, publicist and a victim of Stalin's purges of 1937-38.

Early years 
Listapad was born on 7 April 1897 into a farming family in the village of Varkavičy, Slutsky Uyezd, Minsk Governorate of the Russian Empire (nowadays Slutsk District, Minsk Region of Belarus).

In 1914 he graduated from a teachers college in Panevėžys and returned to his native Slutsk.

After a spell as a teacher, Listapad moved to Minsk and worked in publishing. He also started writing as well as translating. His work “Sluckaje viasieĺlie” (The Slutsk Wedding) was published in 1920. He was an active member of several Belarusian pro-independence organisations, such as the National Committee and “Paparać-kvietka" (The Fern Flower).

Anti-Soviet Resistance and persecution 
In 1920 Listapad was elected to the Belarusian Rada (Council) of Slutsk and participated in the Slutsk uprising, an anti-Bolshevik pro-independence military campaign in central Belarus.

Following the defeat of the uprising, he briefly lived in exile in the Second Polish Republic but returned to Slutsk in 1922 and established an underground anti-Soviet organisation.

He was arrested in 1925 and sentenced to five years in prison.  He was re-arrested in 1930 and then again in 1933 after which he was sent to the Gulag.

Death sentence and posthumous exoneration 
In March 1938 Listapad was sentenced to death for “anti-Soviet propaganda”. He was posthumously exonerated during the Khrushchev Thaw in 1956.

Works 

 Слуцкае вясельле (The Slutsk Wedding) // Беларусь, 1920, No. 108—110
 Узьбіліся на свой шлях (Whipped up in our Way) // Наша думка (Вільня), 1921, No. 9—10

References 

1897 births
1938 deaths
People from Slutsk District
People from Slutsky Uyezd
Belarusian independence movement
Belarusian writers
Gulag detainees
Great Purge victims from Belarus
Soviet rehabilitations